Football is the most popular sport in Tunisia. The most watched sports in Tunisia are football, handball, basketball, volleyball, tennis, and rugby union.

Sport is encouraged in school, and local sports clubs receive financial support from the local governments.

The national stadium is the Stade Olympique de Radès.

Football
 

Football is the most popular sport in Tunisia. The Tunisia national football team, also known as "The Eagles of Carthage", won the 2004 African Cup of Nations (CAN) which was held in Tunisia. They also represented Africa in the 2005 Confederations Cup which was held in Germany, but they could not go beyond the first round. The Eagles of Carthage have participated in 5 FIFA World Cup Championships.

The Premier Football League is the "Tunisian Ligue Professionnelle 1". The main clubs are Espérance Sportive de Tunis, Club Africain, Club Sportif Sfaxien and Étoile du Sahel. The latter team participated in the 2007 FIFA Club World Cup and reached the semi-final match, in which it was eliminated by Boca Juniors from Argentina. Some of Tunisia's star players were centre forward Issam Jemaa, left back Ahmed Seliet and right back Aiyah Wliid Fatiha'a.

Handball
Handball is the second most popular sport in Tunisia. The Tunisia men's national handball team has participated in several Handball World Championships. In 2005, Tunisia held the 2005 Handball World Championship, and they came fourth. The national league consists of about 12 teams, with Etoile du Sahel and Espérance Sportive de Tunis dominating. The most famous Tunisian handball player is Wissem Hmam. In the 2005 World Men's Handball Championship in Tunis, Wissem Hmam was ranked as the top scorer of the tournament. The Tunisian national handball team won the African Cup 10 times as a record, being the team dominating the competition. The Tunisians won the 2012 African Cup in Morocco for the 2nd Consecutive time and it is the 9th title at all by defeating Algeria in the final, the last time tunisia won the African Cup was in 2018 against Egypt.

Basketball

Tunisia recently celebrated a revival in basketball when its national team won the 2011 FIBA Africa Championship, a title rarely won by North African nations. Since then, Tunisia has been home to several players in the Spanish ACB, which is often regarded as one of the world's strongest basketball leagues.
And now Tunisia have an NBA player, in the season of 2015, Salah Mejri has joined the Dallas Mavericks.

Beach volleyball
Tunisia featured a men's national team in beach volleyball that competed at the 2018–2020 CAVB Beach Volleyball Continental Cup.

Cycling
Cycling is a popular recreational sport, with the Tour De Tunisia, being the main annual competition of Cycling in Tunisia.

Pétanque
Pétanque is mostly played in the north of Tunisia. Tunisia has won the world championship many times.

Tennis
In tennis, Tunisia holds a tournament called Tunis Open.  Tennis is a minor sport in Tunisia. The Tunisian Tennis Federation is governing body of sport in Tunisia.

See also
 Tunisia at the Olympics
 Tunisia at the Paralympics

References